Individual rank insignia to the (Army) ground forces and (Navy) naval forces (1935–1940) were established by orders 2590 and 2591, effective from September 22, 1935.

This was mainly directed to supreme commanders, commanding officers, and personnel in charge to exert command and control in the Workers' and Peasants' Red Army, published by order number 176 of the USSR People's Commissariat of Defense, dated from December 3, 1935.

Situation in 1935 
According to these new orders, new insignia of command personnel should indicate:
 Branch of service (e.g. Army, Air Force, or Navy), or special troops
Qualification, professional responsibility, specific knowledge
Rank insignia, operational/ tactical responsibility, e.g. level of military command, formation, unit, or sub-unit.

The top military rank of Marshal of the Soviet Union was created by order of the USSR Central Executive Committee and the “Council of People's Commissars” from September 22, 1935, onward, before the new ranks were issued.

Military ranks 
The military ranks created as a result of the joint decision of the “USSR Central Executive Committee” and the “Council of People's Commissars” from November 21, 1935, are contained in the table below. These replaced the ranks used from 1924.

Additional regulations 
The same orders mentioned above provided for separate ranks for the Political commissars and military specialists, as in the table below.

1937 
More regulations were established in 1937, following general instructions of the Red Army. According to paragraph 10 of this instruction, the following subdivision of personnel was made:
Leading staff: Military officers and heads of departments, military administration and commissariat, medical service, veterinarian service, military legal service
Commanding staff: Personnel with the ranks commander in chief and commander
Junior commanding staff
Enlisted men/ratings

Paragraph 14 of this instruction contained the individual ranks and rank designations according to the order of September 22, 1935, and thus officially sanctioned the additional established OF-1c ranks (Junior lieutenant and Junior military technician), taking effect on August 5, 1937.

1939 
By decision of the extraordinary session of the Supreme Soviet of the USSR (end of August until early September 1939) the law on universal compulsory service took effect, and the new OF4-ranks of Podpolkovnik and Battalion commissar were introduced as a result of the amendments to the rank regulations of 1935. An equivalent OF4-rank for the Soviet navy was not established, however.

Rank designations 

In addition to individual ranks the establishment of defined rank insignia was made in December 1935 as well. From this time military staff, including political commissars, military administration, commissariat, medical service, veterinarian service, and military legal service of the Red Army wore rank insignia as follows:
Rank insignia chevron: on both sleeves (short above the cuff)
Rank insignia big: on both collar-edges of the uniform coat
Rank insignia small: on both collar-edges of the battle jacket (Gymnastjorka)

However, naval military staff wore sleeve insignia (stripes and stars) on both sleeves of the uniform.

 Commander in chief, higher commanding officers and top appointments OF10 to OF6

Rank insignia, big (overcoat): on a rhombic padding, gold coloured border, one to four rhombic red enameled badges, gold coloured Soviet star small/ big
Rank insignia, small (Gymnastjorka): on rectangle padding, gold coloured border, one to four rhombic red enameled badges
Sleeve insignia (overcoat): one to four gold colored chevrons, Soviet star small/ big, one red coloured extra chevron OF10

 Commanding officers and unit leaders OF5, OF3 and OF2

Rank insignia big (over coat): on rhombic padding, gold coloured border, one to three red enameled rectangle badges
Rank insignia small (Gymnastjorka): on rectangle padding, gold coloured border, one to four red enameled rectangle badges

 Subunit leader OF1

Rank insignia big (over coat): on rhombic padding, gold coloured border, one to four red enameled square badges
Rank insignia small (Gymnastjorka): on rectangle padding, gold coloured border, one to four red enameled square badges

 Sub-subunit leader and enlisted men OR8 to OR1

Sub-subunit leader
Rank insignia big (over coat): on rhombic padding, gold coloured border, one to three red enameled triangular badges
Rank insignia small (Gymnastjorka): on rectangle padding, gold coloured border, one to four red enameled triangular badges
Enlisted men: simple rank insignia big (over coat)/ simple rank insignia small (Gymnastjorka)

Table of rank insignia land forces and Air Force 1935–1940

Higher commanders

Middle and senior commanders

Junior commanders and enlisted men

Table of rank insignia for the navy 1935–1940 
The following ranks and insignia were used by the Soviet Navy from 1935 to 1940.

Flag officers

Officers

Sub-unit leader and enlisted men

See also 
 History of Russian military ranks
 Ranks and insignia of the Imperial Russian Armed Forces
 Military ranks of the Soviet Union (1918–1935)
 Military ranks of the Soviet Union (1940–1943)
 Military ranks of the Soviet Union (1943–1955)
 Military ranks of the Soviet Union (1955–1991)
 Ranks and rank insignia of the Russian Federation's armed forces 1994–2010

References 
Citations

Bibliography

 

Russian Federation Army
Military ranks of the Soviet Union